Sendurai is the headquarters of the Sendurai taluk in the Ariyalur district of the Indian state of Tamil Nadu.

Cities and towns in Ariyalur district